Stipan Dora (8 April 1935 – 2002) was a wrestler of Bunjevac descent from Vojvodina, Serbia. He competed in the men's Greco-Roman bantamweight at the 1960 Summer Olympics.

References

External links
 

1935 births
2002 deaths
Serbian male sport wrestlers
Olympic wrestlers of Yugoslavia
Wrestlers at the 1960 Summer Olympics
Sportspeople from Sombor
Bunjevci